The Accusation is a 1950 Italian melodrama film directed by Giacomo Gentilomo.

Cast
 Lea Padovani as Irene
 Marcello Mastroianni as Renato La Torre
 Andrea Checchi as Inspector Constantini
  as Miss Inghirami
 Emma Baron
 Alda Mangini
 Karl Ludwig Diehl as Massimo Ruska
  as Donate
 
 Mary Genni
 Silvana Muzi
 Alessio Ruggeri
 Maria Pia Spini

References

External links

1950 films
1950 drama films
1950s Italian-language films
Italian black-and-white films
Films directed by Giacomo Gentilomo
Italian drama films
Melodrama films
1950s Italian films